Maurice Marston (24 March 1929 – 2002) was an English professional footballer who played as a full-back for Sunderland.

References

1929 births
2002 deaths
People from Trimdon
Footballers from County Durham
English footballers
Association football fullbacks
Silksworth Juniors F.C. players
Sunderland A.F.C. players
Northampton Town F.C. players
Kettering Town F.C. players
English Football League players